The 1979 Texas 400 was a NASCAR Winston Cup Series race that took place on June 3, 1979, at Texas World Speedway in College Station, Texas.

Race report
Two hundred laps took place on an oval track spanning . Darrell Waltrip won the race; beating Bobby Allison by 60 seconds. Eleven thousand and five hundred fans would attend this live race with lasted more than two hours and thirty-three minutes; making it the least attended race in NASCAR's modern era even when comparing races from after the 2008 NASCAR Sprint Cup Series season. Total winnings for this race were $161,250 ($ when considering inflation); Darrell would receive $21,750 of the total purse ($ when considering inflation).

Dale Earnhardt was Waltrip's top challenger before he crashed late in the race. Waltrip had a lap lead but Allison, Baker, and Yarborough had a one-lap dash for second. Allison got second by about two feet over Baker, who was about four feet back. Some of the more notable names to make an appearance here were: Dale Earnhardt, Richard Childress, Cale Yarborough, Terry Labonte, Richard Petty, and J. D. McDuffie.

Notable crew chiefs in attendance for this race were Buddy Parrott, Joey Arrington, Kirk Shelmerdine, Darrell Bryant, Dale Inman, Bud Moore, Tim Brewer, and Jake Elder.

While Jim Hurlbert and John Rezek would make their NASCAR Cup Series debut, Billy Hagan would make his grand exit after this race along with three other drivers. Bill Meazel would make his only NASCAR appearance during this event.

Qualifying

Finishing order

 Darrell Waltrip (No. 88)
 Bobby Allison (No. 15)
 Buddy Baker† (No. 28)
 Cale Yarborough (No. 11)
 Terry Labonte (No. 44)
 Richard Petty (No. 43)
 Richard Childress (No. 3)
 Joe Millikan (No. 72)
 Buddy Arrington (No. 67)
 James Hylton† (No. 48)
 John Rezek (No. 31)
 Dale Earnhardt*† (No. 2)
 Bruce Hill (No. 50)
 J. D. McDuffie† (No. 70)
 D. K. Ulrich (No. 40)
 H. B. Bailey† (No. 36)
 Billy Hagan† (No. 19)
 Earle Canavan† (No. 01)
 Frank Warren (No. 79)
 Tommy Gale† (No. 64)
 Cecil Gordon† (No. 24)
 Mike Potter (No. 76)
 Jimmy Means (No. 52)
 Jim Hurlbert (No. 96)
 Benny Parsons*† (No. 27)
 Ronnie Thomas* (No. 25)
 Baxter Price* (No. 45)
 Ricky Rudd* (No. 90)
 Mike Kempton (No. 69)
 Dick May*† (No. 09)
 Lennie Pond*† (No. 12)
 Bill Meazell* (No. 55)
 John Haver* (No. 58)
 Jimmy Finger* (No. 32)

† signifies that the driver is known to be deceased 
* Driver failed to finish race

Timeline
Section reference:
 Start: Terry Labonte was leading the other drivers as the green flag was waved in the air.
 Lap 5: Jimmy Finger fell out with engine failure.
 Lap 36: John Haver fell out with engine failure.
 Lap 46: Bill Meazel fell out with engine failure.
 Lap 70: Lennie Pond fell out with engine failure.
 Lap 113: Dick May fell out with engine failure.
 Lap 135: Ricky Rudd fell out with engine failure.
 Lap 139: Baxter Price's vehicle developed a problematic transmission.
 Lap 140: The wheel on Ronnie Thomas' vehicle became non-functional.
 Lap 143: The spindle on Benny Parsons' vehicle developed problems.
 Lap 194: Caution due to Dale Earnhardt's accident on turn three; caution ended on lap 198.
 Finish: Darrell Waltrip was officially declared the winner of the event.

Standings after the race

References

Texas 400
Texas 400
NASCAR races at Texas World Speedway